Utah State Route 80 may refer to:

 Utah State Route 80,the state highway designation (legislative overlay) for Interstate 80 (except its concurrency with Interstate 15) within Utah, United States, that runs form Nevada to Wyoming (through Tooele, Salt Lake, and Summit counties)
 By Utah State law, Interstate 80 within the state has been defined as "State Route 80" since 1977
 Utah State Route 80 (1935-1977), the former state highway designation for Utah State Route 92 in north-central Utah, United States, that connects Ashton Boulevard (just west of Interstate 15) in Lehi with U.S. Route 189 in Provo Canyon, looping around the northeastern side of Mount Timpanogos along the route.

See also

 List of state highways in Utah
 List of Interstate Highways in Utah
 List of named highway junctions in Utah
 List of highways numbered 80

External links

 Utah Department of Transportation Highway Resolutions: Route 80 (PDF)